The Soul of a Butterfly (2003) is the autobiography of Muhammad Ali, born Cassius Marcellus Clay Jr., a former heavyweight boxer who was a three time World Heavyweight Champion and is considered by many to be the greatest heavyweight of all time.

It is written in collaboration with his daughter, Hana Yasmeen Ali. It is not a comprehensive autobiography but a breakdown of the important events and experiences in his life; this is suggested in the book's subtitle, Reflections on Life's Journey.

The book includes some of his and his daughter's poetry, and snippets of Sufi thought.

A chapter of the book is written solely by his daughter, Hana, where she recounts an experience with her father, and goes on to reflect upon what she means to him and what she has learned from him.

A review in The New York Times describes the book as "an elliptical, collagelike memoir that offered a philosophical look back at his life."

References

American autobiographies
2004 non-fiction books
Books about Muhammad Ali
Biographies about African-American people
Simon & Schuster books